Suicide Silence is the debut EP by American deathcore band Suicide Silence. Its original release was on September 30, 2005 through Riverside local label Third Degree Records. It was officially reissued by British label In at the Deep End Records in 2006.

Background
The EP was recorded during the summer of 2005 and was released originally on September 30, 2005 through Third Degree Records and was recorded as the band's first ever studio-quality release for listening audiences and was released one year before the band's third demo was recorded, which in turn led to their signing to Century Media. After the release of their 2006 demo, the Suicide Silence EP was re-released through British label, In at the Deep End Records on September 30, 2006 (exactly one year since its original pressing). The EP promoted Suicide Silence to greater heights, providing an ever-expanding fan base.

The EP is released as an Enhanced CD and contains a QuickTime file for “Destruction of a Statue (Live)”, a video that is viewable on Mac and Microsoft Windows personal computers.

The song "Ending Is the Beginning" was re-recorded for the band's 2014 album, You Can't Stop Me. The song's name was also later used as the inspiration for the title of the band's 2014 live video album, Ending Is the Beginning: The Mitch Lucker Memorial Show.

Track listing

Personnel 

Suicide Silence
 Mitch Lucker – vocals
 Rick Ash – guitars
 Chris Garza – guitars
 Mike Bodkins – bass
 Josh Goddard – drums

Production
 Nick "Bygon" Randhawa – recording, mixing
 Nick Barnes – mastering

References

2005 debut EPs
Suicide Silence EPs